Sundowner or Sundowners may refer to:

Film and television
 The Sundowner (1911 film), an Australian lost film
 The Sundowners (1950 film), American Western film directed by George Templeton
 The Sundowners (1960 film), an adventure drama film and adaptation of the Cleary novel
 The Sundowner (2010 film), an American documentary short
 "Sundowner" (Preacher), a 2016 television series episode

Music
 The Sundowners (band), a 1960s American rock and roll band
 Sundowner (band), the solo acoustic project of Chris McCaughan
 The Sundowners (Australian band), an Australian "bush band"
 Sundowner (album), a 2020 album by Kevin Morby

Books and games
 The Sundowners (novel), by Jon Cleary, 1952
 Sundowners, a novel by Lesley Lokko
 The Sundowners (series), novels by James Swallow
 Sundowners, a comic book by Tim Seeley
 Sundowner, a character from the video game Metal Gear Rising: Revengeance

Vehicles
 Ford Sundowner, a famous late 70s Australian-market Ford Falcon or Ford Escort panel van trim package
 Sundowner (yacht), a 1912 yacht once owned by Charles Lightoller
 Beechcraft Sundowner, a single-engined, low-wing, light aircraft
 Ultra-Fab Sundowner, an ultralight aircraft
 Sundowner, a model of the AMC Pacer compact automobile
 Sundowner, the B2000 model of the Mazda B-Series pickup truck
 Sundowner, an Australian railway carriage converted into the Silver Star Cafe in Port Hedland, Western Australia
A moniker for three distinct United States Navy fighter squadrons, all officially designated as VF-111

Other uses
 Sundowner (hotel and casino), a former property in Reno, Nevada
 Sundowner winds, a local wind condition in Southern California
 A person suffering from sundowning, a neurological phenomenon
 An obsolete Australian and New Zealand variant term for a swagman
 A trademark of the Cripps Red apple
 Sundowner town, in the United States, an alternative term for sundown town, where non-white residents are not allowed
 Neoregelia Sundowner, a cultivar of the Neoregelia carolinae plant species
 Sphingomorpha chlorea, a moth called the sundowner